Chetan Korada (born 14 November 1986) is an Indian racing driver who holds the distinction of being the first ever driver in the world to win a race using synthetic feet. He is also the first in Asia, and second in the world after former Formula One driver Alex Zanardi, to compete in motorsport using a prosthetic leg. Having been born with a deformity during birth, he had undergone bi-lateral amputation at a very tender age under medical advice.

Having started racing in 2007, Korada took part in various championships with relative success, including the title and five victories out of six races in the 2009 MMSC Summer Cup Championship (Class-FISSME), as well as a first-place finish in Round 4 of the JK Tyre FMSCI National Racing Championship (Class-Formula LGB Swift 1300cc). He has worked with teams such as WSRF (Wallace Sports Research Foundation), Rams Racing and Meco Motorsports in the past. More recently, he finished runner-up in the National Formula LGB 1300 Championship.

Personal life 

Chetan was born in Rajahmundry, Andhra Pradesh and brought up in Tamil Nadu. He qualified in diverse fields of education and graduated in 2006. Throughout the years of schooling and graduation, he was an active participant in various sports such as Cricket and Basketball which had made it lot more easy to adapt to this sport. He has also explored music and stood as one of the prominent Disc jockeys in south India for a noticeable period and still continues to perform once a year internationally, to keep up with his interest towards music. Open wheel racing has always been his first love as it gave him the thrill of pushing his abilities to the edge and spurred a curiosity in him to learn the mechanism of a race car. He trained himself well all these years, with the support of his mother and gained the ability to compete in International events, which helped him mold the physical and mental strength in him. His ambition is to be a world champion in one of the top International Motorsports events and is truly dedicated to this sport as he looks forward to climb up the ladder with more achievements.

He is currently based in Chennai with his family.

Racing career

2007 
In the former part of his racing career, Chetan participated in Round 2 of JK Tyre National racing championship 2007.

2008 
Chetan went on to participate in 3 races of the MMSC Summer Cup, which gained him a 3rd-place finish. (Class- Formula Maruti/FISSME-800cc)
In the same year, he took part in the JK Tyre Jr. National racing Championship and finished the race in 3 X 3rd place. (Class- FISSME)

2009 
This year saw a turn in Chetan's racing career, as he made 5 wins and 1 second place out of 6 races in the  MMSC Summer Cup Champion 2009(Class-FISSME)  adding a feather to his crown of winning.

2010 
In 2010, Chetan took part in the JK Tyre Jr. National racing Championship (Class-FISSME), and finished the race with 2X 3rd, 1 X 1st Place and 1 X 2nd  place.

2011 
During 2011, Chetan participated in the JK Tyre Jr. National racing Championship with 3 X 3rd, 2 X 1st Place and 1 X 2nd-place finishes. (Class-FISSME).
The memorable moment in the history of his racing career happened as he made a legendary finish on 1st place in Round 4 in the JK Tyre FMSCI National racing championship (Class-Formula LGB Swift 1300cc), starting from 12th on the grid out of 24 race cars. 
He was the runner up at the Kart1 racing event Recg. by FMSCI (Class-4 stroke-9 BHP Karts), during the same year.

2012 
In 2012, he participated in the JK Tyre FMSCI National racing Championship (Class-Formula 4 LGB) and in the Formula 1 Support races in the JK Racing Asia series held in Buddh International Circuit (Class-Formula BMW)
He was the MMS Mini Enduro winner (Class-9BHP Karts) for the same year.

2013 
In this year, Chetan went on to participate in the JK TyreRotax max national championship which was followed by the participation in JK Tyre racing series (Class-Formula 4 LGB).
The ardent racer also participated in the final round of the MRF FMSCI National racing Championship with a 3rd-place finish, during the same year.

2014 
By participating in the MRF FMSCI National racing Championship (Class-Formula 1300) in the year of 2014, Chetan completed the round 1 of the racing championship with 2 X 3rd-place finishes.
He finished 4thout of 24 finalists (From 5790 Entries) in the Mercedes Benz Younger Star Driver Challenge (Class- Mercedes Benz C220 & Mercedes CLA 45 AMG).

2015 
In the year of 2015, he was the MRF FMSCI National Racing Runner-up Champion (Class: Formula 1300 ) and also competed in the Formula 1600 series in the MRF FMSCI National racing championship 2015.
In the latter part of his racing life, Chetan took the role of Instructor for Nissan PS3 GT Academy, India.

2016 
Last year, the veteran racer was preferred for being the Instructor for TATA Prima truck racing program.
He also competed in the MRF National racing championship (Class: Formula MRF 1600).

2017 
Most recently, Chetan became the Formula MRF 1600 National champion second runner up in the MRF FMSCI national racing championship 2017 with a valiant feat of 5 podium finishes.

Public appearances 
Chetan was an invited speaker at many esteemed venues; such as the TedX  Youth at Chennai and the Breakfast show in Chennai Live Radio, in the year 2011. He was also the honored spokesperson at the Tie Con 2014(Indus Entrepreneurship Conference) titled "I CAN DO IT” in the year 2014. While in 2015, he rendered a motivational speech to the members of MMA Madras Management Association. He appeared in the national event of Indian youth conclave 2016 which was held in Chennai to inspire young minds to pursue their passion and reach greater heights.

References & External links

News articles 
 http://www.thehindu.com/features/metroplus/society/go-speed-racer/article2728896.ece
 http://archive.asianage.com/racing/youngster-artificial-legs-emerges-winner-formula-swift-race-888
 http://www.motorsport.com/driver/chetan-korada/
 https://qnet-india.in/chetan-korada-living-in-the-fast-lane/

References 

 https://www.youtube.com/watch?v=Law9dX56KXU(TedX) 
 https://www.youtube.com/watch?v=WIccqRd1fgM (JKNRC 2013 FLGB (Rd.4,Race 2) Chetan Korada) 
 https://www.youtube.com/watch?v=ajv_RyRxHwk (mma)
 https://www.youtube.com/watch?v=eIhV4tsjz4E  (breakfast show)

1986 births
Living people
Indian racing drivers
MRF Challenge Formula 2000 Championship drivers
JK Tyre National Level Racing Championship drivers